The 2004 Carolina Panthers season was the franchise's 10th season in the National Football League and the 3rd under head coach John Fox. It was also the team's 8th season at Bank of America Stadium. They failed to improve upon their record in 2003, a year when they finished the regular season 11–5 and ultimately fell 29–32 in Super Bowl XXXVIII to the New England Patriots and they finished 7–9.  Their collapse to a 1–7 record start was because of key injuries to their starters including wide receiver Steve Smith Sr., through the first eight games. Despite their late-season rally, they failed to make the playoffs since 2002. They would suffer another collapse in 2016 to a 6–10 record that year after appearing in Super Bowl 50 the previous season.

Offseason

NFL Draft

Personnel

Staff

Roster

Schedule

Regular season

Standings

References

Carolina Panthers seasons
Carolina Panthers Season, 2004
Carolina